The Parliament of the Canary Islands is the regional legislature of the Canary Islands, an autonomous community of Spain.  The Parliament has seventy members and members serve on four-year terms. The parliament is based in Santa Cruz de Tenerife, one of the Canaries' two capitals.
thumb|Edifice of the Parliament of the Canary Islands

See also 
List of presidents of the Parliament of the Canary Islands
Politics of Canary Islands
List of legislatures by country

External links 
 

 
1982 establishments in the Canary Islands
Canary Islands